The Best of Elvis Costello and the Attractions is a 1985 compilation album by English musician Elvis Costello and his backing band the Attractions, the first of what would be many career-spanning compilation albums of previously released material for Costello.

A UK variation of the album was called The Best of Elvis Costello – The Man and had a markedly different track listing.

Track listing 
All songs written by Elvis Costello except as indicated.

LP and cassette

Side one
 "Alison" (from My Aim Is True, 1977) – 3:22
 "Watching the Detectives" (from single, 1978) – 3:41
 "(What's So Funny 'Bout) Peace, Love and Understanding?" (Nick Lowe) (from single, 1979) – 3:31
 "Oliver's Army" (from Armed Forces, 1979) – 2:58
 "Pump It Up" (from This Year's Model, 1978) – 3:17
 "Accidents Will Happen" (from Armed Forces, 1979) – 3:00
 "Radio, Radio" (from single, 1978) – 3:06
 "I Can't Stand Up for Falling Down" (Homer Banks, Allen Jones) (from Get Happy!!, 1980) – 2:06

Side two

 "Almost Blue" (from Imperial Bedroom, 1982) – 2:47
 "Beyond Belief" (from Imperial Bedroom, 1982) – 2:32
 "Clubland" (from Trust, 1981) – 3:41
 "Watch Your Step" (from Trust, 1981) – 2:58
 "Shipbuilding" (from Punch the Clock, 1983) – 4:49
 "I Wanna Be Loved" (Farnell Jenkins) (from Goodbye Cruel World, 1984) – 3:50
 "Everyday I Write the Book" (from Punch the Clock, 1983) – 3:47
 "The Only Flame in Town" (from Goodbye Cruel World, 1984) – 3:32

Compact disc
 "Alison" – 3:19
 "Watching the Detectives" – 3:41
 "(What's So Funny 'Bout) Peace, Love and Understanding?" (Lowe) – 3:31
 "Oliver's Army" – 2:57
 "(The Angels Wanna Wear My) Red Shoes" (from My Aim Is True, 1977) – 2:45
 "Pump It Up" – 3:16
 "Accidents Will Happen" – 3:01
 "Radio, Radio" – 3:06
 "I Can't Stand Up for Falling Down" – 2:06
 "A Good Year for the Roses" (Jerry Chesnut) (from Almost Blue, 1981) – 3:07
 "Almost Blue" – 2:46
 "Beyond Belief" – 2:32
 "Man Out of Time" (from Imperial Bedroom, 1982) – 5:27
 "Clubland" – 3:42
 "Watch Your Step" – 2:57
 "Shipbuilding" – 4:49
 "I Wanna Be Loved" (Jenkins) – 3:50
 "Everyday I Write the Book" – 3:47
 "The Only Flame in Town" – 3:32

The Best of Elvis Costello – The Man (UK) LP and cassette

Side one
 "Watching the Detectives" – 3:41
 "Oliver's Army" – 2:58
 "Alison" – 3:22
 "Accidents Will Happen" – 3:00
 "Pump It Up" – 3:17
 "High Fidelity" (from Get Happy!!, 1980) – 2:28
 "Pills and Soap" (from Punch the Clock, 1983) – 3:43
 "(I Don't Want to Go to) Chelsea" (from This Year's Model, 1978) – 3:06
 "New Lace Sleeves" (from Trust, 1981) – 3:45

Side two
 "Good Year For The Roses" – 3:07
 "I Can't Stand Up for Falling Down" – 2:06
 "Clubland" – 3:41
 "Beyond Belief" – 2:32
 "New Amsterdam" (from Get Happy!!, 1980) – 2:12
 "Green Shirt" (from Armed Forces, 1979) – 2:42
 "Everyday I Write the Book" – 3:47
 "I Wanna Be Loved" (Jenkins) – 3:50
 "Shipbuilding" – 4:49

Personnel
 Elvis Costello – vocals, guitar
 Steve Nieve – keyboards
 Bruce Thomas – bass
 Pete Thomas – drums, percussion

Additional personnel
 Caron Wheeler – vocals
 Claudia Fontaine – vocals
 Clover – various instruments
 Chet Baker – trumpet
 Andrew Bodnar – bass
 Steve Goulding – drums
 Daryl Hall – vocals
 Green Gartside – vocals

Charts

Certifications

References

1985 greatest hits albums
Albums produced by Nick Lowe
Albums produced by Roger Bechirian
Elvis Costello compilation albums
Columbia Records compilation albums
Albums produced by Geoff Emerick